Lazzeroni Arms Company is a US firearms and firearm cartridge maker based in Tucson, Arizona. Lazzeroni was founded by John Lazzeroni and is known for designing and producing long range hunting rifles and high speed cartridges.

Lazzeroni rifles
Initially Lazzeroni rifles were made using Remington Model 700 actions, but due to feeding problems and concerns about the action's strength, the company subsequently used a specially modified McBros action with a custom magazine assembly. More recently, the company has used specially made SAKO actions.

Lazzeroni's standard rifle, the L2000ST, has a  barrel and weighs  without a scope. The company's lightweight mountain rifle, the L2000SA, has a  barrel and weighs  without a scope.

Lazzeroni propriety cartridges
Lazzeroni has developed a series of propriety short and long, unbelted magnum cartridges. Lazzeroni propriety cartridges include:

References

External links
Lazzeroni Rifles home page

Companies based in Tucson, Arizona
Firearm manufacturers of the United States